Whitby, a large suburb of Porirua City, New Zealand, located along much of the southern shore of the Pauatahanui Inlet of Porirua Harbour was comprehensively planned in the 1960s (when still in Hutt County) and it has been continuously developed since, with current landscaping and expansion in the hills behind the eastern part of Whitby to facilitate the future growth of the suburb.

The name of the suburb itself, as well as the nautical theme of neighbourhood and street names, are drawn from the life and career of the Pacific explorer James Cook. The bicentennial of his first (1769) visit to New Zealand occurred when the development of Whitby started.

The suburb is commercially centred on the Whitby Shopping Centre, containing almost all the retail businesses in Whitby.

History
In 1967 some 3,180 acres (1,290 ha) of farmland was purchased by a consortium for a new residential development, to be similar to North American new towns; with a population growing to 16,000 in four "neighbourhoods", each focussed on a primary school. Following a town planning appeal hearing in 1974 this became two "neighbourhoods", Adventure and Endeavour.

The first sections in the 01 subdivision were sold by auction in 1970. By May 1971 eight homes were occupied (5 Spinnaker Drive was first); and by 1972, 203 sections had been sold and 62 of the 117 houses built were occupied. By 1998 some 2000 houses had been built. The consortium developed a village centre and a golf course, and operated a commuter bus service from 1 February 1973. The New Zealand Institution of Engineers gave the development their 1978 Environmental Award for an engineering work exemplifying care for and consideration of environmental values.

The original area was part of the Horokiri riding of Hutt County, and some of the later land was in Porirua City. In 1988 the Local Government Commission decided that all of Whitby should come under the Porirua City Council. The Community Developments Consortium (originally Huapai Properties) had partners Fletcher Mainline, Jubilee Investments (part of the Todd Group) and the National Mutual Life Association.

Demographics

Whitby had a population of 10,413 at the 2018 New Zealand census, an increase of 1,569 people (17.7%) since the 2013 census, and an increase of 2,049 people (24.5%) since the 2006 census. There were 3,468 households. There were 5,112 males and 5,292 females, giving a sex ratio of 0.97 males per female, with 2,304 people (22.1%) aged under 15 years, 1,674 (16.1%) aged 15 to 29, 5,118 (49.2%) aged 30 to 64, and 1,308 (12.6%) aged 65 or older.

Ethnicities were 83.8% European/Pākehā, 10.3% Māori, 6.7% Pacific peoples, 8.6% Asian, and 2.8% other ethnicities (totals add to more than 100% since people could identify with multiple ethnicities).

The proportion of people born overseas was 26.4%, compared with 27.1% nationally.

Although some people objected to giving their religion, 51.2% had no religion, 38.2% were Christian, 1.6% were Hindu, 0.5% were Muslim, 0.8% were Buddhist and 2.2% had other religions.

Of those at least 15 years old, 2,520 (31.1%) people had a bachelor or higher degree, and 765 (9.4%) people had no formal qualifications. The employment status of those at least 15 was that 4,812 (59.3%) people were employed full-time, 1,083 (13.4%) were part-time, and 252 (3.1%) were unemployed.

Public transport

Buses servicing the area;

Number 230

Runs between The Crowsnest (Whitby) and Porirua Railway Station (Porirua), stopping at following stops (among others);

The Crowsnest
Spinnaker Drive at Hicks Close
Aotea College opposite Okowai Road
Porirua Station - Stop B

Number 236

Runs Between Navigation Drive (Whitby) and Porirua Railway Station (Porirua), stopping at following stops (among others);

Navigation Drive
Whitby Lakes (Upper Lake)
Spinnaker Drive at Hicks Close
Paremata Road (near 132)
Paremata Station (bus stop)
Oak Avenue (opposite 10)
RNZ Police College - Papakowhai Road 
Porirua Station - Stop B

Education

Primary schools

Discovery School is a co-educational state primary school for Year 1 to 8 students, with a roll of 504.

Whitby Collegiate

Established as Whitby Independent College in January 2004, on the site of the old Duck Creek Golf Course, the school was subsequently bought by Samuel Marsden Collegiate School in 2005 and renamed Marsden Whitby.. A new classroom block was completed in mid-2007 which includes a large art room.

On 1 July 2019 Samuel Marsden Collegiate School Trust Board announced it had made the decision to close Marsden School Whitby at the end of the 2019 school year. On 9 August 2019 Fiso Group Ltd announced plans to acquire the school. The sale of Marsden Whitby to Fiso Investment Group Ltd was finalised on 10 December 2019. The school became Whitby Collegiate at the start of the 2020 academic year.

Other education

Preschool education is available from Discovery Kindergarten, Adventure Kindergarten and Mana Montessori Preschool.

The nearest public secondary school is Aotea College in Aotea.

References

Suburbs of Porirua